Henry Macbeth-Raeburn  (born Henry Raeburn Macbeth; 24 September 1860 – 3 December 1947) was a Scottish painter and printmaker. His father was the portrait painter Norman Macbeth and his niece Ann Macbeth. His elder brothers James Macbeth (1847–1891) and Robert Walker Macbeth  (1848–1910) were also artists.

Life
He was named after the Scottish portraitist Henry Raeburn, and in later life he changed his surname in devotion to the celebrated portraitist. It was also an advantage to distinguish himself from the many members of his artistic family. Macbeth-Raeburn exhibited at the Royal Academy in London from 1881 onwards, and was elected ARA in 1922 and full member in 1933. His diploma work, from 1921, was a mezzotint after Raeburn's 1793 portrait of Dr. Nathaniel Spens. He had a least one daughter, Rita Macbeth-Raeburn, who was depicted in a portrait by her uncle Robert Walker Walker and shown at the Royal Academy in 1905.

In 1936, Macbeth-Raeburn married his second wife, the artist Marjorie May Bacon, in London and shortly afterwards the couple moved to Great Yarmouth. Macbeth-Raeburn died on 3 December 1947 in Great Yarmouth.

References

External links

 

Scottish artists
1860 births
1947 deaths
Royal Academicians
British printmakers
British etchers